Benjamin Randall (November 14, 1789 – October 11, 1859) was a United States representative from Maine from 1839 to 1843.

Early life
Randall was born in Topsham (then part of Massachusetts) on November 14, 1789. He pursued an academic course and graduated from Bowdoin College in 1809.  He studied law and was admitted to the bar in 1812.

Career
Randall commenced practice in Bath in 1812. He served in the Maine State militia in Colonel Reed’s regiment stationed at Cox's Head in September 1814. He was a member of the Maine Senate in 1833, 1835, and 1838.  He was elected as a Whig to the Twenty-sixth and Twenty-seventh Congresses (March 4, 1839 – March 3, 1843).

Upon his return to Maine, he resumed the practice of law and was appointed collector of customs for the port of Bath in 1849.  He served until his death there on October 11, 1859.  His  interment is in Maple Grove Cemetery in Bath.

References

1789 births
1859 deaths
Bowdoin College alumni
People from Bath, Maine
People from Topsham, Maine
Maine lawyers
Maine state senators
Whig Party members of the United States House of Representatives from Maine
19th-century American politicians
19th-century American lawyers